The dorsal venous network of the hand is a network of veins within the superficial fascia on the dorsum (backside) of hand. It is formed by the dorsal metacarpal veins, and gives rise to veins such as the cephalic vein and the basilic vein.

References 

Veins of the upper limb